Bilel Souissi (born 10 June 1986) is a Tunisian footballer who plays as a goalkeeper for Métlaoui.

References

External links
 

1986 births
Living people
Tunisian footballers
Tunisian expatriate footballers
CS Korba players
Espérance Sportive de Tunis players
JS Kairouan players
ES Métlaoui players
Al-Adalah FC players
US Ben Guerdane players
Al-Diriyah Club players
Al-Nahda Club (Saudi Arabia) players
Tunisian Ligue Professionnelle 1 players
Saudi First Division League players
Expatriate footballers in Saudi Arabia
Tunisian expatriate sportspeople in Saudi Arabia
Association football goalkeepers